The Independent Māori Statutory Board is mandated for identifying and promoting issues of significance to Māori communities in Auckland, New Zealand.  The Board was established in 2009 following the amalgamation of seven local and one regional council to establish Auckland Council. The Board monitors Auckland Council activities, providing advice and assisting with the development of official plans and documents.

The Independent Māori Statutory Board is governed by representatives of mana whenua (Māori with ancestral links to Auckland / Tamaki Makaurau) and mataawaka (Māori with ancestral links to other places in New Zealand).

References

External links
 Independent Māori Statutory Board (official website)
 Independent Māori Statutory Board, Auckland Council

Māori politics
Political organisations based in New Zealand
Politics of the Auckland Region
Auckland Council